Figure skating at the 2013 Winter Universiade included a pairs event for senior level skaters. The short program was held on December 12 and the free skating on December 13, 2013.

Results

Panel of Judges

References

Figure skating at the 2013 Winter Universiade